The Museum of Contemporary Art of Rome, usually known as MACRO, is a municipal contemporary art museum in Rome, Italy. The museum is housed in two separate places: a former brewery in Via Nizza, in the Salario quartiere of the city; and a former slaughterhouse in Piazza Orazio Giustiniani, in the quartiere of Testaccio.

History
The project began in the late 1990s in the site of the old Peroni Brewery. After an initial phase of restructuring, which allowed the opening of six rooms in September 1999, the museum was officially opened 11 October 2002.

Since 2003 the museum has also had an annex entitled MACRO Future, which comprises two refurbished buildings of 1,000 square metres each in the former slaughterhouse of Rome, several kilometers away in the Testaccio neighborhood.

Renovation
Since July 2004, an extension has been under construction in order to present all of the permanent collection. These arrangements have been entrusted to the French architect Odile Decq.

Collection
MACRO's permanent collection includes a selection of some of the most significant expressions of the Italian art scene since the 1960s, such as the group Forma 1 with the works by Carla Accardi, Antonio Sanfilippo, Achille Perilli, Piero Dorazio, Leoncillo and Ettore Colla; the Arte Povera with Mario Ceroli and Pino Pascali; the Scuola di Piazza del Popolo with Tano Festa, Mario Schifano, Titina Maselli and Mimmo Rotella.

The gallery collects works by such artists as Giovanni Albanese, Andrea Aquilanti, Gianni Asdrubali, Domenico Bianchi, Bruno Ceccobelli, Sarah Ciracì, Enzo Cucchi, Fabrice de Nola, Gianni Dessì, Gianfranco Baruchello, Daniele Galliano, Federico Guida, Felice Levini, Fabio Mauri, Luigi Ontani, Cristiano Pintaldi, Piero Pizzi Cannella, Gioacchino Pontrelli, Sissi, Marco Tirelli.

References

External links
 

Rome
Art museums and galleries in Rome
Art museums established in 1999
Museum of Contemporary Art of Rome
Rome Q. IV Salario